This is a list of the British Labour Party general election manifestos since the nascent party first fielded candidates at the 1900 general election. From its foundation, general election manifestos were issued for the Labour Party as a whole, whereas the manifestos of the Conservative and Liberal parties generally took the form of a form of a short personal address by the leader of the party until the 1950s.

See also

List of Conservative Party (UK) general election manifestos
List of Liberal Party and Liberal Democrats (UK) general election manifestos
New Labour, New Life for Britain

Further reading
 Iain Dale, Labour Party general election manifestos, 1900–1997, Routledge, 2000,

References
Archive of Labour Party Manifestos, 1900–2001
Party Manifestos

General election manifestos
Party platforms
Political manifestos